"Gonna Fly Now", also known as "Theme from Rocky", is the theme song from the movie Rocky, composed by Bill Conti with lyrics by Carol Connors and Ayn Robbins, and performed by DeEtta West and Nelson Pigford. Released in 1976 with Rocky, the song became part of 1970s American popular culture after the film's main character and namesake Rocky Balboa as part of his daily training regimen runs up the 72 stone steps leading to the entrance of the Philadelphia Museum of Art in Philadelphia and raises his arms in a victory pose, while the song plays. The song was written in Philadelphia. The song is often played at sporting events, especially in Philadelphia. Most notably, the Philadelphia Eagles play the song before the opening kickoff of every home game at Lincoln Financial Field.

Reception 
The song (whose lyrics are only 30 words long) was nominated for Best Original Song at the 49th Academy Awards. The version of the song from the movie, performed by Conti with an orchestra, hit number one on the Billboard Hot 100 chart in 1977, while a version by jazz trumpeter Maynard Ferguson hit the top 30. Disco versions by Rhythm Heritage and Current were on the chart at the same time (Conti's own version reveals some early disco influence in the orchestration). Billboard ranked Conti's version as the No. 21 song of 1977. Conti's single was certified Gold by the RIAA, for shipments exceeding one million in the United States. The American Film Institute placed it 58th on its AFI's 100 Years...100 Songs list.

New York Times critic John Rockwell called it "a classic bit of movie-music pomposity" but said it had a "cheesy inspirational appeal."

Variations 
In Rocky II, an alternative version of the song was used, with a children's choir singing the chorus. Rocky III included an updated disco influenced arrangement during the training montage on the beach. This recording is however missing from the soundtrack album, the sleeve notes of which say "All music on this album selected by Sylvester Stallone", who instead opted to reprise the original versions of "Reflections" from the first film, and "Gonna Fly Now" and "Conquest" from the second installment.

Rocky IV was scored by Vince DiCola who mainly introduced new themes of his own but "Gonna Fly Now" returned with its composer for later installments. In Rocky V, two different versions of the song are played: an instrumental horn version and a different orchestral version. In Rocky Balboa, a slightly different version of the song used more trumpets and different vocal tones. The soundtrack for that film also includes a vocal remix performed by Natalie Wilde. Creed samples the first few notes of the track during the film's last fight, as does its sequel, Creed II.

Personnel
Writing – Bill Conti, Carol Connors, Ayn Robbins
Producer – Bill Conti
Recording engineer – Ami Hadani
Vocals – DeEtta West and Nelson Pigford
Drums – Johnny Guerin
Bass – Max Bennett
Guitar – Dennis Budimir
Piano – Mike Melvoin
Horns performed by uncredited Los Angeles-based studio musicians group

Chart performance

Weekly charts
Rhythm Heritage

Bill Conti

Year-end charts

Maynard Ferguson

In popular culture 
Due to its original use, the song (or a soundalike of it) is used frequently in various forms of popular media where a main character is forced to train hard in order to defeat an opponent, often during a montage sequence.

Renditions of the song without lyrics were used by the groundbreaking Toronto newscast CityPulse beginning in 1976, with an arrangement by Maynard Ferguson. The theme was subsequently remixed and rearranged every few years, until 2002.

The song was also used in a 1994 episode of The Fresh Prince of Bel-Air, during Will Smith's visit to Philadelphia.

Elements of "Gonna Fly Now" are incorporated in "Bucky Done Gun", a song off M.I.A.'s album Arular.

French radio 
The daily French radio program Les Grosses Têtes, on the RTL French radio network, uses an arrangement by Gaya Bécaud from "Gonna Fly Now".

Ice hockey 
The Finnish professional ice hockey team Jokerit from the KHL uses "Gonna Fly Now" as their goal song.

Politics 
American politician and former Vice President Walter Mondale used "Gonna Fly Now" as his presidential campaign song in 1984. 

American President Donald Trump also used "Gonna Fly Now" at his 2016 presidential campaign rallies. When composer Bill Conti was asked what he thought of Trump's use of the song, Conti stated: “I think it’s great. I’m an equal opportunity kind of guy. The song is my creation. And anytime something I create is used, I am happy about that. Music has no politics attached to it."

References

External links 
 
 

Songs from Rocky (film series)
Film theme songs
1976 songs
Songs written by Bill Conti
Songs written by Carol Connors (singer)
Boxing music
United Artists Records singles
Billboard Hot 100 number-one singles
Cashbox number-one singles